Haym is part of the name of the following people:

Surname
Nicola Francesco Haym (1678–1729), Italian opera librettist, composer, theatre manager, performer, numismatist
Rudolf Haym (1821–1901), German philosopher

Given name
Haym Solomon (1740–1785), Polish émigré, American financier
Haym Salomon, Son of Liberty (1941), historical novel about Haym Solomon by Howard Fast
Haym Soloveitchik (1937–), Jewish academic

See also

Chaim